Sartinville (also Sartinsville) is an unincorporated community in Walthall County, Mississippi, United States. Its elevation is 433 feet (132 m). The town was struck by a violent EF4 tornado on April 12, 2020 that damaged or destroyed numerous structures, killed four people, and injured at least three others.

References

Unincorporated communities in Walthall County, Mississippi
Unincorporated communities in Mississippi